This list includes notable peer-reviewed scientific journals in forestry, forest science, and related fields. More than 180 forestry journals were being published in 2008.

List of journals

See also 

 Forestry literature
 List of botany journals
 List of environmental journals
 List of environmental social science journals
 List of forestry universities and colleges
 List of historic journals of forestry
 List of scientific journals

References

Notes

Bibliography 
 ScienceWatch.com. 2010, March 4. "Journals ranked by impact: forestry"
 Scimago Lab. 2011. "Journal rankings: forestry"
 Vanclay, Jerome K. 2008. "Ranking journals of forestry using the h-index," Journal of Informetrics 2(4): 326–334.

 
Lists of academic journals
Journals
 Journals
Forestry